Reuben Lindsay Walker (May 29, 1827 – June 7, 1890) was a Confederate general who served in the artillery during the American Civil War.

Early life
Walker was born in Logan Village, Albemarle County, Virginia. He graduated from the Virginia Military Institute (VMI) in 1845. He then became a civil engineer, and later, a farmer in Virginia.

Civil War
When the Civil War began, Walker took command of the Purcell Artillery unit. After seeing action at the First Battle of Bull Run (First Manassas), Walker became the chief of artillery to General A.P. Hill. Lindsay Walker, as he was known, amassed a lengthy combat record, serving in every one of the Army of Northern Virginia's major battles except the Seven Days Battles (he was ill at the time). He commanded artillery of Hill's Light Division during the Battle of Harpers Ferry and the Battle of Antietam in the Maryland Campaign. When Powell Hill was promoted to corps command, Walker became the head of the Third Corps artillery. He commanded the corps' reserve artillery in the Battle of Gettysburg, directly commanding the battalions of Majs. David G. McIntosh and William J. Pegram. He had direct command of all the corps' artillery battalions thereafter, including in the Overland Campaign and the Siege of Petersburg. In all, Walker served in 63 battles and engagements and was never once wounded, despite being a large target at 6'4" tall and despite often serving in very hot fighting. Walker was promoted to brigadier general on February 18, 1865.

Postbellum career
After the war, Walker moved to Selma, Alabama, where he headed the Marine & Selma Railroad. He returned to Virginia in 1876 and became an engineer for the Richmond and Alleghany Railroad. As a civil engineer, Walker oversaw the construction of an addition to the Virginia State Penitentiary and the Texas State Capitol building.

Death
Walker died in Fluvanna County, Virginia, and was buried in Richmond's famous Hollywood Cemetery.

See also

List of American Civil War generals (Confederate)

Notes

References

 Eicher, John H., and David J. Eicher, Civil War High Commands. Stanford: Stanford University Press, 2001. .
 Sifakis, Stewart. Who Was Who in the Civil War. New York: Facts On File, 1988. .
 Warner, Ezra J. Generals in Gray: Lives of the Confederate Commanders. Baton Rouge: Louisiana State University Press, 1959. .

1827 births
1890 deaths
Confederate States Army brigadier generals
People of Virginia in the American Civil War
Virginia Military Institute alumni
Burials at Hollywood Cemetery (Richmond, Virginia)
People from Logan, West Virginia
American civil engineers
Engineers from West Virginia
People of West Virginia in the American Civil War
Military personnel from West Virginia